The Quatuor Mosaïques is an Austrian string quartet, founded in 1987 by Erich Höbarth, Andrea Bischof, Anita Mitterer, and Christophe Coin, four members of the Concentus Musicus Wien who play on historical musical instruments. The name of the quartet refers to mosaics and is intended to reference the way details impact on the complete work of art. They specialize in music of the 18th century.

The three Austrian musicians and the French cellist Christophe Coin got to know each other in Vienna as members of Concentus Musicus working under the direction of Nikolaus Harnoncourt. With their shared experiences as a starting point, they decided to form a classical string quartet playing on period instruments. The primary aim was not to create the sort of ‘authenticity’ that belongs in museums, but rather to ensure in their work a living link to the great European quartet tradition. Hence an essential inspiration for the group was the Végh Quartet, of which Erich Höbarth had been a member for its last three years.

The Quatuor Mosaïques  has received the Gramophone Award for its interpretations of Haydn.

In 2006 the Quatuor was invited to Spain to play the quartet of Stradivari instruments belonging to the Spanish Crown. It presented a programme of quartets by Arriaga at the Royal Palace in Madrid, which was subsequently recorded on CD. The Quatuor Mosaïques' very extensive repertoire includes rarely performed works by Pleyel, Tomasini, Werner, Jadin, Gross, Boëly,  Schumann and Brahms. It has performed works of the early twentieth century, by composers such as Debussy, Bartók and Webern.

Discography
The group's first recordings were on the Astree label of Michel Bernstein. The Quatuor's  discography includes works by Arriaga, Beethoven, Boccherini, Boëly, Haydn, H. Jadin, Mendelssohn, Mozart and Schubert.

 Albrechtsberger, Entre ciel et terre (2009, coll. « Parenthèses », Laborie label LC24508) 
 Arriaga, Trois quatuors à cordes (1-7 September 2006, Universal Music) 
 Beethoven, Quatuors à cordes nos 1 - 6, op. 18 (April 1994, September 2004 et March 2005, Astrée / 3CD Naïve) 
 Beethoven, Quatuors à cordes nos 12 - 16 (2017, 3 SACD Naïve)
 Boccherini, Quintettes avec piano, op. 56 et 57 [G.407-408 et G.411] et [G.414-415 et G.418] « dédiés à la Nation Française » - Quatuor Mosaïques et Patrick Cohen, piano-forte (October 1993 et November 1989, Astrée E 8518 & E 8721) , 
 Boëly, Trio en ut majeur, op. 5 n° 2 - Quatuor à cordes n° 1 - Mélodie pour violoncelle n° 2 en mi majeur - Sextuor en ré majeur - Quatuor Mosaïques, Christophe Coin, Éric Lebrun, orgue (2009, Laborie label) 
 David, Troisième quatuor en ré mineur (May 2010, coll. « Parenthèses », Laborie LC 24585) 
 Joseph Haydn — repris en coffret de 10CD  :
 Quatuors opus 20 (janvier 1990 et mars 1992, 2CD Astrée E 8786 / E8785) 
 Quatuors opus 33 (August 1995 et October 1996, 2CD Astrée-Auvidis) 
 Quatuors opus 64 (June 2003, Naïve) 
 Quatuors opus 76 (November 1998 et January 2000, 2CD Astrée / Naïve E 8665) 
 Quatuors opus 77 (March 1989, Astrée E 8800) 
 Les sept dernières paroles de Notre Rédempteur sur la croix (17 April 1992, Astrée E 8803) 
 Hyacinthe et Louis Emmanuel Jadin, Trois quatuors à cordes : op. 3  n° 1, op. 2 n° 1; Quatuor n° 2 (October 1994, Valois V4738 / Naïve V4903) , 
 Mendelssohn, Quatuor à cordes, op. 12 et 13 (December 1997, Astrée-Auvidis) 
 Mozart — Les quatuors étant repris en coffret de 4CD  :
 Quatuor à cordes 18 et 19 (November 1993, Astrée E 8748)
 Quatuor à cordes K 387 et 421 (September 1990, Astrée E 8746) 
 Quatuors à cordes K 499 et K 589 (January 2001, Astrée-Auvidis) 
 Quatuors à cordes K 575 et K 590 (July 1998, Astrée) 
  
 Schubert : 
 Quatuors à cordes nos 1 & 13 opus 125/D87 et opus 29/D 804 « Rosamunde » (Astrée-Auvidis E 8580) 
 Quatuor à cordes « Der Tod und das Mädchen », D 810 ; Quatuor à cordes, D 173 (2009, Laborie) 
 Woelfl, Quatuors à cordes op. 4 n° 3 et op. 10 nos 1 & 4 - sur des instruments du luthier viennois, Franz Geissenhof (1753–1821) (26-30 September 2011, Paladino Music PMR0023)

Founding (and current) members
Erich Höbarth (violin, J. Guarnerius filius Andreae, Cremona 1705)
Andrea Bischof (violin, 18th century French)
Anita Mitterer (viola, Girolamo Devirchis, Brescia 1588)
Christophe Coin (cello, C.A. Testore, Milano 1758)

References

External links
 Article on Artists Management Company Ltd site

Musical groups established in 1987
Austrian string quartets
1987 establishments in Australia